The 1926–27 Magyar Kupa (English: Hungarian Cup) was the 10th season of Hungary's annual knock-out cup football competition.

Final

See also
 1926–27 Nemzeti Bajnokság I

References

External links
 Official site 
 soccerway.com

1926–27 in Hungarian football
1926–27 domestic association football cups
1926-27